The Saipan reed warbler (Acrocephalus hiwae) is a critically endangered songbird of the Northern Mariana Islands. It is considered a subspecies of the nightingale reed warbler by some taxonomists.  It occurs on two islands: Saipan and Alamagan. An estimated population of 2700 birds was reported in 2009 on Saipan, and on Alamagan 950 birds were reported in 2010.

It inhabits wetlands, thickets and the margins of forests. The female is slightly smaller than the male. Both sexes have a long bill compared to other reed warbler species.

Threats to the survival of the Saipan reed warbler include habitat destruction resulting from urban development and agriculture, the introduction of invasive species, and volcanic eruptions.

References

Saipan reed warbler
Birds of the Northern Mariana Islands
Saipan reed warbler